Artificial Intelligence is the tenth solo studio album by Welsh rock musician John Cale, released on 6 September 1985 by Beggars Banquet.

Background and recording
Artificial Intelligence was originally titled Black Rose. The title and some changes to the tracks delayed the album being released for five weeks.

Having produced Nico's sixth and final studio album Camera Obscura (1985), Cale recorded this album in three weeks at Strongroom Studios with her backing band, the Faction, with a couple of additional musicians. The duo of Gill O'Donovan and
Susie O'List who performed backing vocals on this album had previously performed backing vocals on tours with Eurythmics.

Following the chaotic period during which the album (and the previous two) were recorded, John and Risé Irushalmi Cale's daughter Eden was born, which promptly caused Cale to kick his addictions to alcohol and cocaine, and to temporarily abandon recording studio albums and performing live in favour of other projects (until 1989's Words for the Dying).

Release
Artificial Intelligence was released on 6 September 1985 by Beggars Banquet. "Dying on the Vine" was released as a single in the UK and "Satellite Walk" (Remix by Carl Beatty) in the UK and Germany. The otherwise unavailable instrumental track "Crash Course in Harmonics" on the B-side of "Dying on the Vine".

Critical reception

In a retrospective review for AllMusic, critic Stewart Mason described the album as "an encouraging partial return to form." Trouser Press wrote: "Moody and contained, but energetic and occasionally stimulating, A.I. is a reasonable if unspectacular addition to Cale’s extensive catalogue."

Track listing

Personnel
Adapted from the Artificial Intelligence liner notes.

Musicians
 John Cale – vocals; bass guitar; guitar; keyboards; viola
 David Young – guitar
 James Young – keyboards
 Graham Dowdall – percussion
 Gill O'Donovan – backing vocals
 Susie O'List – backing vocals

Production and artwork
 John Cale – producer
 David Young – associate producer
 Dennis P. Nechvatal – design; artwork from the painting Warrior
 Karin Preus – artwork; graphics
 Phil Bodger – mixing; recording
 Alan Jakoby – recording

See also
 List of albums released in 1985
 John Cale's discography

References

External links
 

Artificial Intelligence
Artificial Intelligence
Albums produced by John Cale
Beggars Banquet Records albums